One Cut Two Cut is a 2022 Indian Kannada-language comedy film written and directed by Vamsidhar Bhogaraju. The film stars Danish Sait, who plays the role of arts and craft teacher. Prakash Belawadi, Samyukta Hornad plays in pivotal roles. The film is produced by Ashwini Puneeth Rajkumar and Gurudath A Talwar of PRK Productions. It was released on 3 February 2022 on Amazon Prime Video.

Plot 

Gopi is a mild-mannered and soft-spoken arts and crafts teacher who works at the Bytarayanapura school. Due to the nature of his work, he does not earn much and is ridiculed by his neighbor. Meanwhile, ex-radio host Pruthviraj plans to organize a protest against the government to earn fame on social media and become more popular than Amitabh Bachchan, whom he envies. But, nobody turns up for the protest except for Ayan a struggling stand-up comedian, Neha, a fashion blogger, and Gurudev an ex-serviceman. The four decide to take drastic steps to force the government to fulfill their demands.

Meanwhile, Gopi reaches the school and finds that the teachers are unenthusiastic about teaching the children. He also bumps into Nagaveni a teacher at the school and the woman he likes. It is revealed that Gopi and his late mother once visited Nagaveni's house to ask her hand in marriage but was rejected by her father due to his educational qualifications. Gopi entertains the students by making origami but his fun session is soon interrupted by the four silly radical activists (wearing tracksuits and masks) who plan to hold the school hostage until their demands are met. Gopi becomes the translator between the activists and the CM's secretary.

The secretary thinks of it as a joke but realizes the gravity of the situation when he gets a selfie of the hijackers with a gun. The hijackers demand the resignation of the CM but later agree to give a formal list of demands (all of which are absurd). This incident is picked up by news anchor Komala (Soundarya Nagaraj), but she is forced to broadcast meaningless news by her boss instead of this. The secretary, realizing how this event can affect the upcoming elections decides to end the issue quietly by ordering a secret agent(Vamsidhar Bhogaraju) and his 'elite' team to eliminate the hijackers. The film then focuses on the three parties and how incredibly ridiculous their day is.

By nightfall, the silly hijackers realize their plan will yield no fruitful results, and decide to escape before they are arrested. However, Pruthviraj is reluctant and gets increasingly agitated. All this is captured secretly by Komala who resigns when her boss does not allow her to broadcast her footage. The 'elite' team finally ends up at the wrong school and Pruthviraj ends up shooting Gopi in the back. Finally, all the parties head home in the ambulance carrying Gopi and the silly activists formally apologize for the hijacking. Gopi informs the relieved secretary about the end of the situation and requests him to improve the conditions of the government school. Gopi even lies to the secret agent about not knowing who the hijackers were and everyone goes home happy.

The film ends by showing how all the activists have mended their ways and how Nagaveni has ended up marrying another person instead of Gopi.

Cast
 Danish Sait as Gopi, art and craft teacher
 Prakash Belawadi as Pruthviraj, working in All India Radio and hates Amitabh Bachhan 
 Samyukta Hornad as Nagaveni, school teacher 
 Vineeth Beep Kumar as Ayan, struggling stand-up comedian 
 Roopa Rayappa as Neha, fashion blogger 
 Manoj Sputnique Sengupta as Gurudev, ex-serviceman 
 Aruna Balraj as Hindi Teacher 
 Sampath Maitreya as CM's Secretary 
 Ashwin Hasan as Murty, News Channel Owner 
 Vamsidhar Bhogaraju as Special Agent 
 Rishi as Groom who marries Nagaveni, special appearance

Soundtrack 

Music composed by Nakul Abhyankar. First were released on 31 January 2022.

References

External links 

Indian comedy-drama films
Amazon Prime Video original films